SM-130686 is a small-molecule drug which acts as a potent, orally-active agonist of the ghrelin/growth hormone secretagogue receptor (GHSR) and growth hormone secretagogue, with around half the potency of the endogenous agonist ghrelin as a stimulator of growth hormone release. It produces dose-dependent increases in muscle mass and decrease in body fat, and is under investigation for the treatment of growth hormone deficiency and other medical conditions. Concerns about its potential use as a performance-enhancing drug for athletes have led to the development of urine tests for SM-130686 and other GHSR agonists, even though no drugs from this class have yet progressed to clinical use.

See also 
 List of growth hormone secretagogues

References 

Diethylamino compounds
Carboxamides
Chloroarenes
Experimental drugs
Ghrelin receptor agonists
Growth hormone secretagogues
Indolines
Trifluoromethyl compounds
Tertiary alcohols
Oxindoles